Potassium tetracyanonickelate is the inorganic compound with the formula K2Ni(CN)4. It is usually encountered as the monohydrate but the anhydrous salt is also known. Both are yellow, water-soluble, diamagnetic solids. The salt consists of potassium ions and the tetracyanonickelate coordination complex, which is square planar.

Preparation

Potassium tetracyanonickelate is prepared by treating aqueous solutions of nickel(II) salts with potassium cyanide. The synthesis is often conducted stepwise, precipitating the nickel dicyanide coordination polymer first. This route allows removal of excess potassium salts:  
 Ni2+ + 2KCN → Ni(CN)2 + 2K+
 Ni(CN)2 + 2KCN → K2[Ni(CN)4]
This procedure yields the monohydrate. That solid dehydrates at 100 °C.

Reactions
The N-terminus of the cyanide ligand is basic and nucleophilic. The complex binds four equivalents of boron trifluoride:
 K2[Ni(CN)4] + 4BF3  →  K2[Ni(CNBF3)4]

Cyanide is a sufficient pi-acceptor ligand to allow reduction of K2Ni(CN)4 to the Ni(0) derivative. Thus, potassium in anhydrous ammonia affords the tetraanionic, tetrahedral Ni(0) derivative [Ni(CN)4]4-.
 K2[Ni(CN)4] + 2K  →  K4[Ni(CN)4]
An intermediate in this conversion is K4[Ni2(CN)6], which features an Ni-Ni bond.

References

Nickel complexes
Cyano complexes